Nazar Samvelovich Petrosyan (born 6 June 1951 in Mary, Turkmenistan) is a Russian football coach and a retired Soviet football player. He is of Armenian descent. Currently, he is the president of FC Nika Moscow.

Honours
 Soviet Top League winner: 1973.
 Soviet Cup winner: 1973, 1975.

International career
Petrosyan made his debut for USSR on 28 November 1976 in a friendly against Argentina.

References
  Profile

1951 births
Living people
People from Mary, Turkmenistan
Armenian footballers
Armenian football managers
Soviet footballers
Soviet Union international footballers
Soviet Top League players
FC Ararat Yerevan players
PFC CSKA Moscow players
FC Kuban Krasnodar players
Soviet football managers
Russian football managers
Turkmenistan people of Armenian descent
Soviet Armenians
Ethnic Armenian sportspeople
Association football forwards
Association football midfielders